Grogan may refer to:

People
 Grogan (surname), a surname of Irish origin
 Grogan baronets (1859-1927)
 Sir Edward Grogan, 2nd Baronet (1873-1927)
 Sir Edward Grogan, 1st Baronet (1802-1891)

Places
 Grogan, Georgia, United States, see List of places in Georgia (U.S. state) (E–H)
 Grogan, Minnesota, USA; an unincorporated community 
 Grogan, Missouri, USA; a ghost town
 Grogan, New South Wales, in Temora Shire, Australia
 Grogan Morgan Range, Nunavut; mountain range in Canada
 Grogan, Columbus, Ohio, USA; a neighborhood in the unincorporated community of Milo-Grogan
 Grogan Creek, North Carolina, USA; a creek that feeds Cedar Rock Falls

Facilities and structures
 William H. Grogan House, Brevard, Transylvania County, North Carolina, USA; a NRHP listed building
 Johnson-Grogan Highway, Brevard County, Florida, USA

Other uses
 Grogan Medal, Australian rules football award

See also

 
 
 
 Groganville, Queensland, Australia

Disambiguation pages